Nyker is a town in Denmark.

Nyker may also refer to:

 Jasandra Nyker, chief executive officer of BioTherm Energy
 Nyker Group, a group of geological formations from the Early Cretaceous
 Ny Kirke, a church in Nyker